Testosterone is a 2003 film directed by David Moreton and starring David Sutcliffe, Antonio Sabato, Jr., and Jennifer Coolidge. It is an adaptation of James Robert Baker's novel Testosterone.

Plot summary
Dean Seagrave (David Sutcliffe) is a thirty-something graphic novelist living in L.A., and though he's found personal happiness with his boyfriend Pablo (Antonio Sabato, Jr.), he can't surmount his writer's block slump following his successful debut graphic novel, Teenage Speed Freak. His life begins to unravel when his editor, Luise (Coolidge), gives him an ultimatum and Pablo leaves him. Lonely, depressed, and at the end of his rope, Seagrave flies to Argentina in search of closure, but the characters he discovers there – Pablo's secretive and controlling Mother (Sônia Braga), Pablo's ex-lover Marcos (Leonardo Brzezicki), and Marcos' enigmatic sister Sofia (Celina Font) – conspire to prevent him from reaching Pablo.

Cast
 David Sutcliffe as Dean Seagrave
 Celina Font as Sofia
 Antonio Sabato Jr. as Pablo Alesandro
 Jennifer Coolidge as Louise
 Leonardo Brzezicki as Marcos
 Sônia Braga (billed as Sonia Braga) as Pablo's Mother
 Dario Dukah as Guillermo
 Jennifer Elise Cox as Sharon, the Perky Chick
 Davenia McFadden as Marnie
 Ezequiel Abeijón as Rogelio
 Martín Borisenko as Hot Cater Waiter
 Barbara Bunge as Bridesmaid
 Gustavo Chapa as Cemetery Man
 Daniel Di Biase as Taxi Driver
 Gabriel Dottavio as Customer
 Americo Ferrari as Bald Man
 Harry Havilio as Front Desk Man
 Wolfram Hecht (billed as Wolfram Hoechst)	as Older Gentleman
 Carlos Kaspar as Fat Bad Dude
 Miriam Manfredini as Tourist Mother
 Carolina Marcovsky as La Luna Hostess
 Luis Mazzeo as Policeman
 Hector Pazos as Big Policeman
 Fabrizio Perez as Fat Bad Dude #2
 Luis Sabatini as Salesman
 Alejandro Stulchlik as Fat Bad Dude #3
 Claudio Torres as Fat Bad Dude #4
 Marcos Woinsky as Mr. Ottenhouse
 McCaleb Burnett as Guy in Turtleneck
 Julie Fay as Fabulous Gallery Guest
 Sergio Gravier as Slight Man
 Marcelo Aguilar as Mr. Chip / Guy in car

Filming location
Although the setting for the story of Testosterone starts in Los Angeles, California and then moves to Buenos Aires, Argentina, the Los Angeles scenes were filmed in Buenos Aires and the Buenos Aires scenes were filmed in Los Angeles.

References

External links

2003 films
American LGBT-related films
Films based on American novels
2003 comedy-drama films
American comedy-drama films
Films shot in Buenos Aires
Films set in Buenos Aires
2003 LGBT-related films
LGBT-related comedy-drama films
2000s English-language films
2000s American films
English-language Argentine films